Manchán of Min Droichit ( Manchéne, Manchianus died c. 652) was an Irish scholar and Abbot.

Biography
His name is also attached to Dissert Gallen, Co. Laois.

Manchán twice makes his appearance in Latin sources as a scholar whose authority still mattered after his death. First, he is probably the Manchianus, called pater and sapiens, who is named by an anonymous Irishman in his preface to the De mirabilibus sacrae scripturae ('On the miraculous things in sacred scripture'), written in 655 and so shortly after Manchán's death. The author, who uses the nom de plume Augustine and is for this reason known today as the Irish Pseudo-Augustine, appears to have been a pupil of Manchán as well as of one Eusebius.

Second, Manchán may be the 'M., doctor noster' who is cited in a Hiberno-Latin commentary on the Catholic Epistles for his exegetical views on the Epistle of James. This anonymous work is uniquely preserved in a manuscript now held at Karlsruhe (Germany), but once in the possession of Reichenau Abbey. The glosses also cite a number of 7th-century Irish scholars, including Laidcenn mac Buith Bannaig, Breccanus, Banbán and Bercanus mac Áed, who are known to have been associated with Cumméne Fota (Cummianus).

He is probably the Manchan referenced as "Patronus de Coolcasheen, S. Manihinns, Conf.. 2 Jau." in the diocese of Ossory, now St. Munchin's Church, who is claimed to be son of Moenacli, according to the 'Book of Lenister'. The Manchín feast day commemorated on 2 January in  probably identifies him, with this feast day shared by the likely identical Manchan of Coolcashin, and the contemporary Mainchín of Luimnech, whose festival is otherwise recorded on 29 December.

Death
The death of Manchán falls between 648–652 according to the Irish Annals-

 Annals of Clonmacnoise "A.D. 648, Maincheni, Abbot of Meanadrochit, died".
 Annals of the Four Masters "A.D. 649, Manchinus abbot of Menadrochatt, died". 
 Annals of Ulster .
 Annals of Tigernach "A.D. 652, The falling asleep of Manchéne, abbot of Monadrehid".

See also

 Caolánn
 Cumméne Fota
 Blessed Marianus Scotus
 John Whitehead (theologian)

Notes

Primary sources
 Retrieved 6 February 2010.

Secondary sources

Further reading
 
  Edition of the Irish commentary on the Catholic Epistles.
 Pseudo-Augustine, De mirabilibus sacrae Scripturae, ed. J. P. Migne, Patrologia Latina 35: 2149–200 (2152 and 2176).

7th-century Irish abbots
7th-century Irish writers
Medieval saints of Leinster
People from County Laois
People from County Offaly
Irish Latinists
7th-century Latin writers